The ninth season of NYPD Blue premiered on ABC on November 6, 2001, and concluded on May 21, 2002.

Plot
The body of Danny Sorenson is found in a shallow grave. Sipowicz gets a new partner, a son of his old nemesis. Together they track the mafia members who killed Sorenson. Valerie becomes pregnant with Baldwin, but she loses the baby and Baldwin has doubts as to whether it was a miscarriage or an abortion.

Cast

Main
 Dennis Franz as Andy Sipowicz 
 Mark-Paul Gosselaar as John Clark, Jr. 
 Gordon Clapp as Greg Medavoy 
 Henry Simmons as Baldwin Jones 
 Charlotte Ross as Connie McDowell 
 Bill Brochtrup as John Irvin 
 Garcelle Beauvais Nilon as Valerie Haywood 
 Esai Morales as Tony Rodriguez 
 Jacqueline Obradors as Rita Ortiz (episodes 8-22)

Recurring
 John F. O'Donohue as Eddie Gibson (episodes 3-8, 10, 16)

Episodes

References

NYPD Blue seasons
2001 American television seasons
2002 American television seasons